USS Nereus (AC-10) was one of four Proteus-class colliers built for the United States Navy before World War I. Named for Nereus, an aquatic deity from Greek mythology, she was the second U.S. Naval vessel to bear the name. Nereus was laid down on 4 December 1911, and launched on 26 April 1913 by the Newport News Shipbuilding and Dry Dock Company, Newport News, Virginia, and commissioned on 10 September 1913.

Service history
Detached from Naval Overseas Transportation Service on 12 September 1919, Nereus served with the Atlantic Fleet until decommissioned at Norfolk on 30 June 1922. She was laid up there until struck from the Navy List on 5 December 1940. Sold to the Aluminium Company of Canada on 27 February 1941, Nereus operated out of Montreal carrying bauxite from the Caribbean to aluminum plants in the United States and Canada.  Her master (commanding officer) was John Thomas Bennett of the Canadian Merchant Navy.

Loss
Nereus was lost at sea sometime after 10 December 1941 while steaming from St. Thomas in the Virgin Islands (along the same route where her sister ship  had disappeared) with ore destined to make aluminum for Allied aircraft. Nereus was presumed sunk after being torpedoed by a German U-boat. However, there are no German U-boat claims for this vessel.  Both Nereus and Cyclops could have been lost to U-boats which were later lost themselves to Allied action or storms at sea.

The wreckage has never been located nor the actual cause of her disappearance determined. A memorial listing for her crew can be found on the CWGC Halifax memorial.

References

 

Ships built in Newport News, Virginia
Colliers of the United States Navy
World War I auxiliary ships of the United States
World War II shipwrecks in the Atlantic Ocean
Missing ships
1913 ships
Proteus-class colliers
Maritime incidents in December 1941
Ships lost with all hands
World War II merchant ships of Canada
Fleet of the Canadian Merchant Navy